Abagrotis kirkwoodi is a species of cutworm or dart moth in the family Noctuidae. It is found in North America.

The MONA or Hodges number for Abagrotis kirkwoodi is 11014.

References

Further reading

 
 
 
 
 

Abagrotis
Articles created by Qbugbot
Moths described in 1968